21C127 Taw Valley is a Southern Railway West Country class 4-6-2 Pacific steam locomotive that has been preserved. It is presently operational at the Severn Valley Railway.

Career
21C127 was built in April 1946 at the SR's Brighton Works and was named Taw Valley, the name coming from the name of a river in Devon. She was originally allocated to Ramsgate followed by Exmouth Junction in 1947. In 1948 when British Railways was formed and the four pre grouping companys were merged into one she was renumbered from 21C127 to 34027. She was later rebuilt in 1957 to her current shape and was re-allocated to Bricklayer's Arms, and then followed by a transfer to Brighton in 1961 and Salisbury in 1963 where she was to remain for the rest of her days working for BR until August 1964 when she was withdrawn from service and towed to Barry Scrapyard.

Naming
Taw Valley was named after the river that flows through Devon and Dartmoor. She was one of thirty-six "West Country" light pacifics to be named but not have a coat of arms applied during her service days.  The coat of arms that she currently wears with her nameplate is post BR and was added in 2015 following the completion of her most recent overhaul.

Withdrawal and preservation
34027 was withdrawn from service in August 1964 and was towed to Barry Scrapyard.

She was rescued for preservation in 1980 by Bert Hitchen and was moved away from Barry Island to the North Yorkshire Moors Railway where her restoration began, she was later moved to the East Lancashire Railway, but in August 1985 she was once again moved, to the Severn Valley Railway, where her restoration continued. Her restoration was completed in October 1987 and she then began her trial running, but did not enter service on the Severn Valley Railway until June 1988.

Return to steam
34027's restoration from Barry Scrapyard condition was completed in October 1987 and following the completion of her running in period entered service on the Severn Valley Railway in June 1988, with a formal renaming ceremony taking place on 4 June that year. Alongside her work on the mainline she did put in mileage on the SVR until 1992 when she departed from the Railway. She returned to the SVR as a resident in 2001, when her owner Bert Hitchen put her up for sale and she was acquired by SVR member Phil Swallow. Following her withdrawal from the mainline she was disguised as scrapped sister 34036 Westward Ho Following an appearance at the SVR's Autumn Steam Gala in 2005 she was withdrawn from service requiring a complete overhaul.

Taw Valley'''s most recent overhaul began in the spring of 2006. She was reunited with her boiler in time for the 2012 Autumn Steam Gala when newly allocated resident to the railway and classmate 34053 "Sir Keith Park" was running at the line's autumn steam gala. She was completed and run in in-time to haul an incoming "British Pullman" railtour on 16 May 2015 from Bewdley to Bridgnorth. The train, consisted of 10 Pullman coaches, 2 Mark 1 coaches and a Class 67 diesel. 34027 Taw Valley is the only operational steam loco on the railway (apart from 600 Gordon) to be equipped with air-braking to operate air-braked rolling stock.

Queen's Platinum Jubilee
In Early 2022 the engine was temporarily repainted from BR Lined Green with late crest into lined purple livery with the number 70 and renamed Elizabeth II for the Queens Platinum Jubilee celebrations in June 2022. Alongside replacing its 34027 number with 70 the engine also had its nameplates changed to Elizabeth II. It had been intended to repaint the engine back into BR lined green by September 2022, but following the death of Elizabeth II on 8 Sept 2022 the repaint was delayed. When outshopped the engine originally wore red backed nameplates, these were changed to black following Queen Elizabeth's death with the addition of 1926 - 2022 added beneath.

 the engine still wears this livery but has reverted to wearing its own Taw Valley nameplates and its 34027 number. With the engne planned to be withdrawn in autumn 2023 for an intermediate overhaul, instead of returning to its authentic BR lined green livery with the late crest the engine is to be repainted into Southern wartime black. The engine will wear its original Southern number 21C127 and Taw Valley nameplates with Southern lettering on its tender (with the class rebuilt between 1955 and 1961 & with Taw Valley being rebuilt in 1957, non of the rebuilt engines wore Southern Railway colours).

Mainline service
Alongside being based on SVR her owner Bert decided to take her back out onto the mainline in 1989, and following a test run from Derby to Sheffield she became a regular mainline runner. She worked regular tours including "The North Wales Coast Express", "Welsh Marches Express" and "Cumbrian Mountain Express" from 1989 to 1994. Her most famous mainline duties included pulling the Venice-Simplon Orient Express on day trips from London to locations around the former southern region including Portsmouth. During this time she was based at Stewarts Lane TMD alongside fellow VSOE engine SR Merchant Navy class 35028 Clan Line.

Beyond 2000, 34027 was still a regular runner on the mainline and for a brief period was painted maroon with Hogwarts Express nameplates to promote the Harry Potter series. It was suggested that she be used as the locomotive in the first film of the series when it was being worked on, but was rejected by the film's director Chris Columbus as she looked too modern; 5972 Olton Hall was chosen instead.

She was then sold by Bert Hitchen to SVR-based member Phil Swallow, and mainline running continued until May 2005, when she was retired from the mainline and shortly afterwards retired for overhaul. During this time she was disguised as scrapped sister engines 34045 Ottery St Mary and 34036 Westward Ho.

 her owner had no plans to put 34027 back on the main line. Being fitted with air braking. she can haul air-braked charter trains along the SVR.

On 10 February 2022 the Severn Valley Railway announced that the locomotive would temporarily have its name changed to Elizabeth II and be painted purple in celebration of the Platinum Jubilee of Elizabeth II. The engines nameplates originally had a red background, following the death of Elizabeth II'' on 8 September 2022 the background colour was changed to black and 1926 - 2022 was added beneath the nameplates. In November 2022 it was announced that after spending 2022 in lined purple the engine would be repainted into Southern Railways lined black with yellow Southern lettering on the tender and its pre nationalisation number 21C127, the rebuilt members of the class were rebuilt between 1955 and 1961 so none of the rebuilt engines wore Southern Railway colours (34027 being rebuilt in 1957). The engine will remain in this livery until its withdrawn for overhaul at the end of the 2023 season with an expected return to service in late 2024/early 2025. Following which the engine will return to BR Lined Green with the late crest.

References

External links
 34027 Out on test in BR Maroon
 Classic Steam Loco Collection - 34027 Taw Valley (part 1)
 Classic Steam Loco Collection - 34027 Taw Valley (part 2)
 34027 Taw Valley in 1994

4-6-2 locomotives
Railway locomotives introduced in 1946
 
West Country
Standard gauge steam locomotives of Great Britain
Streamlined steam locomotives
West Country
West Country 34027
Locomotives saved from Woodham Brothers scrapyard